Thailand Continental Cycling Team is a Thai UCI Continental cycling team established in 2017.

Team roster

Major wins
2017
Stage 2 Tour of Thailand, Thanawut Sanikwathi
2018
Overall Tour of Indonesia, Ariya Phounsavath
Stage 4 Peerapol Chawchiangkwang
Stage 4 Tour de Singkarak, Thanakhan Chaiyasombat
2019
Stage 5 The Princess Maha Chakri Sirindhorn's Cup, Sarawut Sirironnachai
2020
 National Time Trial Championships, Sarawut Sirironnachai
Stage 1 The Princess Maha Chakri Sirindhorn's Cup, Thanawut Sanikwathi
Stages 3 & 4 The Princess Maha Chakri Sirindhorn's Cup, Sarawut Sirironnachai
2021
Stage 3 The Princess Maha Chakri Sirindhorn's Cup, Sarawut Sirironnachai

National champions
2020
 Thailand Time Trial, Sarawut Sirironnachai

References

External links

UCI Continental Teams (Asia)
Cycling teams established in 2017
Cycling teams based in Thailand